Wyatt is an unincorporated community in Harrison County, West Virginia, United States. Wyatt has a post office with ZIP code 26463.

The community was named after Z. W. Wyatt.

References

Unincorporated communities in Harrison County, West Virginia
Unincorporated communities in West Virginia
Coal towns in West Virginia